Steve Kuzmanovski (born 4 January 1997) is an Australian professional footballer who plays for St George City in the NSW League One.

Club career 
As a 16-year-old, Kuzmanovski played seven matches, scoring twice, for the AIS team in the ACT division of the 2013 National Premier Leagues.

A product of Western Sydney Wanderers youth academy, he scored a goal for the club in a youth league match against Perth Glory FC. On 6 January 2015, he made his A-League debut against Melbourne Victory.

On 8 June 2015, Kuzmanovski signed for Melbourne City on a two year deal.

On 1 May 2017, Melbourne City announced Kuzmanovski would not be offered a new contract.

Honours

International 
Australia U20
 AFF U-19 Youth Championship: 2016

References

External links 
 

1997 births
Living people
Australia youth international soccer players
Australia under-20 international soccer players
Association football wingers
Western Sydney Wanderers FC players
Melbourne City FC players
Altona Magic SC players
National Premier Leagues players
A-League Men players
Soccer players from Sydney
Australian soccer players